The 1976 Swedish Rally (formally the 26th International Swedish Rally) was the second round of the 1976 World Rally Championship season. Swedish driver Per Eklund took the only WRC win of his career.

Results 

Source: Independent WRC archive

Special stages

References

External links 
 Official website of the World Rally Championship
 1976 Swedish Rally at Rallye-info 

Sweden
1976
1976 in Swedish motorsport